Jiaolong is the sixth studio album by Canadian musician Daniel Snaith, released on October 16, 2012 by Merge. It is the first album in Snaith's discography credited under the moniker Daphni, and is more dancefloor oriented than his work as Caribou.

The album was named a longlisted nominee for the 2013 Polaris Music Prize on June 13, 2013. It received positive reviews, although less than Snaith's previous release, Swim.

Track listing

References

2012 albums
Dan Snaith albums
Merge Records albums